Metacheiromys ("next to Cheiromys") is an extinct genus of palaeanodont mammal from the paraphyletic subfamily Metacheiromyinae within paraphyletic family Metacheiromyidae, that lived in North America (what is now Wyoming) during the early to middle Eocene.

It had long claws and a narrow head similar in shape to that of an armadillo or an anteater (though it was actually related to the modern pangolins). The shape of its claws suggests that it probably dug through the soil in search of food, most likely small invertebrates. Unlike modern anteaters or pangolins, it had powerful canine teeth, but only a very few cheek teeth, instead using horny pads in its mouth to crush its food.

The generic name means "next to Cheiromys" because the scientist who saw the bones mistakenly thought that the animal was a primate with hands like those of the aye-aye (Daubentonia madagascariensis), one synonym being Cheiromys.

Metacheiromys and its relatives, including the enigmatic Ernanodon, constitute the order Palaeanodonta, thought to be the sister taxon of pangolins.

Phylogenetic tree
The phylogenetic relationships of genus Metacheiromys is shown in the following cladogram:

References

Palaeanodonta
Eocene mammals
Eocene mammals of North America